Sitai or Sitae, also Siai and Siteon Chiphas, was a town in the Roman province of Mesopotamia, inhabited during Roman and Byzantine times. 

Its site is located near Ziyaret tepe in Asiatic Turkey.

References

Populated places in ancient Upper Mesopotamia
Former populated places in Turkey
Roman towns and cities in Turkey
History of Diyarbakır Province
Populated places of the Byzantine Empire